God Loves Caviar (translit. O Theós agapáei to chaviári; in Russia known as Pirates of the Aegean Sea) is a 2012 Russian-Greek drama film directed by Yannis Smaragdis.

Plot
The film is based upon the true story of Ioannis Varvakis, a Greek caviar merchant and eventual benefactor from Psara who was formerly a pirate.  He was born in Psara, and from an early age he learned to navigate the seas, an occupation revered and steeped in tradition on the island where he grew up. At the age of 17 he built his own ship, which he would later offer to the Russians during the Orlov Revolt. Ultimately, his ship was destroyed, and he turned to Saint Petersburg to ask for an audience with Catherine the Great. He was given compensation for the loss of his ship and granted authorization to fish freely in the Caspian Sea. Due to his superb navigational skills and excellent seamanship abilities, he dominated the Caspian Sea and soon became substantially wealthy. When he initially discovered the superior caviar of the Beluga Sturgeon, he quickly realized that there could be an incredible market trading for this product. From the caviar trade he eventually became a millionaire and later donated part of his fortune for important works that improved the life of Russians and Greeks on the Black Sea coasts. In his later years, he became a member of the Filiki Eteria, which would contribute to the overthrow of the Ottoman rule of Greece. He died in 1825 in Zante, during the Greek War of Independence. After his death, his entire estate went to the Ioannis Varvakis Foundation which would offer up important grants throughout Greece. The script follows the entire life of Varvakis, but the film's narration begins with his final moments in Zante.

Cast
 Sebastian Koch as Ioannis Varvakis
 Yevgeny Stychkin as Ivan
 Juan Diego Botto as Alexios Lefentarios
 Olga Sutulova as Helena Romachoff
 John Cleese as McCormick
 Catherine Deneuve as Empress Catherine II of Russia
 Akis Sakellariou as Kimon
 Nick Ashdon as British Ambassador
 Marisha Triantafyllidou as Maria Varvakis
 Alexandra Sakelaropoulou as Varvakis' Mother
 Fotini Baxevani as Ludmilla
 Christoforos Papakaliatis as Grigori Potemkin
 Lakis Lazopoulos as Fisherman of God
 Irene Balta as Varvakis' Wife
 Pavlos Kontoyannidis as Shipbuilder
 Alexandros Mylonas as Temporary Prime Minister
 Yannis Vouros as Businessman A
 Manos Vakousis as Businessman B
 Giorgos Ktenavos as Andreas Varvakis
 Kris Radanov as Alexei Orlov
 Giorgos Kotanidis as Theodoros Kolokotronis

Reception
The film was one of the official selections that debuted in 2012 Toronto Film Festival. In 2013 the film was the highest-grossing film in Greece.

References

External links
 
 
 Official site 

2012 films
2012 drama films
2010s adventure drama films
2010s English-language films
English-language Greek films
English-language Russian films
Films set in 1825
Russian adventure drama films
Greek biographical films
Greek adventure drama films
Greek multilingual films
2010s Greek-language films
Pirate films
Films shot in Crete